Between Day and Dream is a 1922 German silent film directed by Bruno Ziener.

The film's art direction was by Fritz Kraenke.

Cast

References

Bibliography

External links

1922 films
Films of the Weimar Republic
Films directed by Bruno Ziener
German silent feature films
German black-and-white films